The Hands of Orlac  (a.k.a. Hands of the Strangler) is a 1960 British-French horror film directed by Edmond T. Gréville, starring Mel Ferrer, Christopher Lee, and Dany Carrel, and based on the novel Les Mains d'Orlac by Maurice Renard.

Cast
 Mel Ferrer ...  Stephen Orlac 
 Christopher Lee ...  Nero the magician 
 Dany Carrel ...  Régina / Li-Lang 
 Lucile Saint-Simon ...  Louise Cochrane Orlac 
 Felix Aylmer ...  Dr. Francis Cochrane 
 Peter Reynolds ...  Mr. Felix 
 Basil Sydney ...  Maurice Seidelman 
 Campbell Singer ...  Inspector Henderson 
 Donald Wolfit ...  Professor Volchett
 Donald Pleasence ...  Graham Coates 
 Peter Bennett ...  1st Member 
 George Merritt ...  2nd Member
 Arnold Diamond ...  Dresser 
 Janina Faye ...  Child 
 Gertan Klauber ...  Fairground attendant 
 Mireille Perrey ...  Madame Aliberti 
 David Peel ...  Airplane's pilot 
 Walter Randall ...  Waiter 
 Anita Sharp-Bolster ...  Volchett's Assistant 
 Manning Wilson ...  Inspector Jagger 
 Yanilou ...  Emilie 
 Edouard Hemme ...  Auge 
 Charles Lamb ...  Guard

Production
The film was shot in both French and English versions.

Critical reception
Derek Winnert found it "intriguing and partly enjoyable if sometimes strained and lethargic".

References

External links

1960 films
1960 horror films
1960s multilingual films
British horror films
British multilingual films
English-language French films
Films about pianos and pianists
Films based on horror novels
Films based on French novels
Films directed by Edmond T. Gréville
French horror films
French multilingual films
1960s French-language films
Films scored by Claude Bolling
1960s British films
1960s French films